Charlie John Collins (born 22 November 1991) is an English footballer who plays as a striker for Metropolitan Police. He began his career with Milton Keynes Dons.

Career
Born in Hammersmith, London, Collins made his debut for Milton Keynes Dons on 1 May 2010 in the League One clash with Brighton & Hove Albion at the Stadium:mk which ended in 0–0 draw.

On 8 November 2011, Collins featured as a trialist in a match for Forest Green Rovers reserves against Crawley Town.

On 13 January 2012, it was announced that Collins would be joining Aldershot Town on a one-month loan deal.

In March 2012 he joined Tamworth on loan, along with teammate George Baldock. He made his debut in a 1–1 league draw against Gateshead and completed the full match.

He was released by the Milton Keynes Dons on 29 December 2012 after the expiration of a six-month contract extension. On 2 February 2013, he joined Metropolitan Police.

Career statistics

A.  The "League" column constitutes appearances and goals in the Football League and Conference National.
B.  The "Other" column constitutes appearances and goals in the Football League Trophy.

References

External links

1991 births
Living people
Footballers from Hammersmith
English footballers
Association football forwards
Milton Keynes Dons F.C. players
Kettering Town F.C. players
Aldershot Town F.C. players
Tamworth F.C. players
English Football League players
National League (English football) players
Metropolitan Police F.C. players